Michael Farrell (born 2 October 1962)  is an Australian Paralympic powerlifter.  He was born in the South Australian town of Elliston. He won a bronze medal at the 1988 Seoul Games in the Men's Up To 100 kg event. He finished eight in the Men's Over 100 kg at the 1996 Atlanta Games.

References

Paralympic powerlifters of Australia
Powerlifters at the 1988 Summer Paralympics
Powerlifters at the 1996 Summer Paralympics
Paralympic bronze medalists for Australia
Medalists at the 1988 Summer Paralympics
Living people
1962 births
Paralympic medalists in powerlifting